Nanga-Boguila is a sub-prefecture of Ouham in the Central African Republic.

Geography 
The commune of Nanga Boguila is located in the north-west of the Ouham prefecture. It is crossed by the axis Nana-Bakassa - Boguila - Bongaro 1, national highway RN1.

Population  
In 2003, the population was 23,982 people.

History  
Nanga Boguila is erected in sub-prefecture of Ouham since May 2, 2002 by division of southern part of the sub-prefecture of Markounda. 

On 22 January 2014 Revolution and Justice rebel group attacked Boguila killing 22 Seleka fighters. On 25 June 2020 Central African Patriotic Movement rebel group reportedly moved to Nanga-Boguila. On 27 September 2020 Return, Reclamation, Rehabilitation established their presence there. Nanga-Boguila was recaptured by government forces on 18 February 2021.

Villages 
The main villages are: Bondaro, Boria, Boguila 1, Bogone 3, Boaya, Bomentana Center and Bowansen.  The commune has 102 villages in rural areas identified in 2003: Arab 2, Bedin, Boaya, Bobaina, Boboro, Bodongue, Boferan, Bogama Kette, Bogama Kota, Bogassa, Bogodo, Bogomba, Bogomte Kette, Bogota Kota, Boguela, Boguila 1, Boguila 2, Boguila Kete, Boguila-Bedobo, Boguila-Gbogbol, Bohing, Bokarin, Bokote Kota 1, Bokote Kota 2, Bokote-Alato, Bokote-Kette, Bokote-Sesse, Bokparatong, Boleing Kette, Boling-Kota, Bomantana, Bomantanagbazoro, Bombaye-Kette, Bombaye-Kota, Bomber-Nouna, Bomentana-Biti, Bonanga, Bonasse 3, Bonasse Kota, Bonasse-Kette, Bondondi, Bondoro-Kette, Bondoro-Kota, Bongba Kette, Bongbara, Bongone 3, Bonoi 1, Bonoi 2, Bonte, Boria, Borok-Mo Kota, Borosse, Borro 1, Bossara, Bossole, Botongo, Botoni, Bounana-Breeding, Boundia, Bowain, Bowansem, Bowara, Boyanga, Boyanga Kette, Boyanga Kota, Bozanzon, Bozera, Bozera -Kette, Bozera-Kota, Bozima, Bozinga, Bozoe, Bozona 1, Bozona 2, Medical Center, Dangsom, Daring, Dombang, Donfera, Gbadam, Gbakera, Gbangono, Gbanou, Gbaring,  Gbassom, Gom-Okpa, Gompo, Kobana 2, Kobana 2, Mbombara-Kette, Mbombara-Kota, Nanga, Ndakta, Ngazomgue, Sagon, Samon, Sokodo 3, Sokodo-Kette, Sokodo-Kota, Teyengue, Togbissa, Zekewen.

Education 
The commune has 21 public schools: Sous-prefectorale of Boguila, Bolgue, Boyanga-Kota, Bobai-Kota, Nanga, Bondodi, Sokodo, Bombara-Kota, Bomentana, Bonasse-Kete, Bokote-Kete, Samon, Bokote-Kota 2, Bowing, Bomantana-Beti, Bogama-Kete, Botongo, Bouria, Gbounou, Bondaro and Bokote-Sesse.

Political representation 
The Sub-prefecture of Nanga-Boguila has been a legislative constituency since 2005.

References 

Sub-prefectures of the Central African Republic
Populated places in the Central African Republic